Shady Run Canyon is a valley in the U.S. state of Nevada.

Shady Run Canyon was named for the fact it had shade trees.

References

Valleys of Churchill County, Nevada